Clare Jones is a former camogie player, winner of six All Ireland Camogie Championship medals with Kilkenny during their period of ascendancy in the 1980s.

Career
Born in Clare, she also won club championship medals with St Paul’s in 1969, 1970, 1974 and 1976.

References

External links
 Camogie.ie Official Camogie Association Website

Kilkenny camogie players
Living people
Year of birth missing (living people)